ED Pfee is a slogan used by ZANU–PF and Zimbabwe president Emmerson Mnangagwa's supporters as a sign of endorsing him towards the Zimbabwe 2018 elections. The ED Pfee slogan is used as a rally chant and social media slogan as #EDpfee.

Meaning

ED abbreviation refers to Emmerson Dambudzo, which are the president's names and pfee is a Shona slang term derived from the word 'Pfekera' which refers to entering.

References

Hashtags
Political catchphrases